Francesco Rocca (born 2 August 1954) is an Italian professional football coach and former player, who played as a defender. He spent his entire career with Italian club Roma, where he won the Coppa Italia twice. He was the coach of the Italy national under-20 football team from 2008 until 2011. He also led the Italy Olympic side to a fourth-place ranking at the 1988 Summer Olympics.

Club career
Born in the San Vito Romano village 40 km from Rome, Rocca played his club football exclusively for Roma from 1972 to 1981. Rocca played 163 games for Roma, including 141 games in Serie A and 22 in the Coppa Italia cup – winning the later competition for two consecutive years between 1980 and 1981 – but did not score any goals for the club.

International career
Rocca played 18 games for the Italy national football team from 1974 to 1976, and scored a goal for Italy against the United States national soccer team.

At the age of 26, a serious injury forced Rocca to retire.

Managerial career
As a manager, Rocca took Italy to a fourth place at the 1988 Summer Olympics. He also led the U-19 team which finished as the runner-up in the 2008 UEFA European Under-19 Football Championship. After the tournament he changed to being a coach of the U-20 team, and led his team to the 2009 FIFA U-20 World Cup.

He is one of eleven members of the Hall of Fame of A.S. Roma.

Style of play
Rocca was nicknamed "Kawasaki" (after the Japanese brand of motor bikes) because of his pace, work-rate, energy, and durability in the left-back position; he was also an accurate crosser of the ball.

Honours

Club
Roma
Coppa Italia: 1979–80, 1980–81

Individual
A.S. Roma Hall of Fame: 2012

References

1954 births
Living people
Sportspeople from the Metropolitan City of Rome Capital
Italian footballers
Italian football managers
A.S. Roma players
Serie A players
Italy international footballers
Italy under-21 international footballers
Association football defenders
A.S. Roma non-playing staff
Association football scouts
Footballers from Lazio